Lapointe, La Pointe, laPoint, le-Pointe, le point, or variant, may refer to:

Places

United States
La Pointe, an antiquated name for Galena, Illinois
Lapoint, Utah, USA, an unincorporated community
La Pointe, Wisconsin, an unincorporated community
La Pointe (town), Wisconsin, a town
La Pointe County, Wisconsin

Other places
Lapointe (electoral district), a former Canadian electoral riding
Lapointe, Nord-Ouest, Haiti
Le Point (Hong Kong), a housing estate in Hong Kong
La Pointe, Saint Barthélemy

Other
Lapointe (surname)
Le Point, French weekly news magazine
Le Point (TV series), a former Canadian television news series

See also
 Dufour-Lapointe
 Point (disambiguation)